is a Japanese footballer currently playing as a forward for Matsumoto Yamaga.

Club career
Kikui impressed at both high school and university level, consistently being named top goal-scorer at tournaments. He was announced as a player of Matsumoto Yamaga ahead of the 2022 season.

Career statistics

Club
.

Notes

References

1999 births
Living people
Association football people from Osaka Prefecture
Ryutsu Keizai University alumni
Japanese footballers
Association football forwards
Japan Football League players
J3 League players
Vissel Kobe players
Matsumoto Yamaga FC players